The UIC Country Code is a two digit-number identifying countries in which members of the International Union of Railways (UIC) are active. The UIC has issued numbering systems for rolling stock (UIC wagon numbers) and stations that include the country code. The values are defined in UIC leaflet 920-14.

The country code had originally been designed as a company code but mainly as a consequence of the reorganisation of the rail sector in Europe changes were necessary. When the former UIC vehicle number became a vehicle register number (European Vehicle Number, EVN) issued by governmental organisations, the code was attributed to the countries. Vehicle numbering is now governed by the Intergovernmental Organisation for International Carriage by Rail and in Technical Specifications for Interoperability (TSI) of the European Union.

Railroads in North America use a system based on company-specific reporting marks, and a similar system, ISO 6346, is used for intermodal containers.

Table of codes

Notes

References 

 Country codes – UIC
 Spreadsheet of current codes - UIC

Rail transport classification systems
Lists of country codes
International Union of Railways
International rail transport
Rail transport in Europe
Railway vehicles register numbers